Andreea Ioana Moldovan (born September 28, 1989), professionally known as AMI, is a Romanian singer and songwriter. She rose to fame following her 2012 singe "Trumpet Lights" with producer David Deejay.

Life and career 

AMI was born on September 28, 1989, in the city of Baia Mare. She made her music debut at the age of 3 after her parents noticed her talent. The first contest she participated in was a local music festival, where she won the grand prize for her performance of the song "Un actor". She attended classes at the Children's Palace in Baia Mare and participated in numerous national and international festivals. She also studied the violin for 12 years.

AMI moved to Bucharest in the 12th grade, took and passed the baccalaureate exam and attended the courses of the National University of Music, Jazz Composition-Light Music section.

Since 2009, the artist has been active in Paula Seling's vocal backing band, and in 2011 she participated in the first edition of the X Factor talent contest, broadcast by Antena 1.

AMI's debut single was released on August 27, 2012, is titled "Trumpet Lights" and is a collaboration with Glance. The song composed by David Deejay reached 3rd place in the Top Airplay 100 and benefited from a video made by Vali Bărbulescu and the VB Visuals team.

In September 2013, AMI was invited to sing the song "Deja Vu" with Grasu XXL. The song enjoyed success, occupying the first position at the top of the most broadcast songs in Romania. For the artist, "Deja Vu" is both the first single in Romanian and a change of musical style. For this single, Grasu XXL and AMI won four awards at the Media Music Awards Gala in September 2014.

AMI accepted the challenges of survival shows and participated in the reality TV shows Ferma vedetelor in 2016 on Pro TV and Exatlon Romania in 2019 on Kanal D.

In 2019, AMI, together with Roxen, Theea Miculescu, Mihai Alexandru Bogdan and Viky Red, composed Roxen's debut single, entitled "Ce-ți cântă dragostea". The song became a hit in early 2020, peaking at number one in the Top Airplay 100 in March, 81 days after its release.

The year 2020 brought her collaborations with B.U.G. Mafia for "8 zile din 7", Killa Fonic for "Antidot", Mark Stam for "Ca să fii fericit", and Florian Rus for "Regrete". In December 2020, AMI won the fifteenth season of the show Te cunosc de undeva!, broadcast by Antena 1.

On April 28, 2021, the singer released the single "Enigma", a new collaboration with Tata Vlad from B.U.G. Mafia. "Enigma" is the first single from the upcoming album of the same name and reached number 3 in the Top Airplay 100 and remained in the Top 10 for another 12 weeks.

The first single from 2022 is called "Butterfly Dance", which is a collaboration with Sasha Lopez and was released on April 28.

Discography

Singles

As lead artist

As featured artist

Filmography

Television

Awards and nominations

References

External links 

 
 

1989 births
People from Baia Mare
21st-century Romanian singers
Global Records artists
English-language singers from Romania
Living people
Eurodance musicians
Romanian dance musicians
Romanian women singers